Catherine Nay (born 1 January 1943 in Tours) is a French political columnist and commentator.

Biography
After she attended primary and secondary schools in Périgueux, Nay started studying law but dropped in license year to become a journalist. In 1968, at the age of 25, she was hired by the political service of the newspaper L'Express led by Jean-Jacques Servan-Schreiber, where she covered right-wing politics. From 1975, Nay made a major part of her career at radio station Europe 1.

In 2005, she became an advisor to Europe 1's chairman Jean-Pierre Elkabbach. In 2008–9, she appeared several times in Le Grand Journal (Canal+) as a political commentator along with Alain Duhamel, Philippe Val and Jean-Michel Aphatie.

Since 2007, Nay has appeared regularly in Les grandes voix d'Europe 1 on Saturdays. In April 2012, she was a jury member of Qui veut devenir président ? broadcast by France 4.

Upon the commemoration of the May 1958 and May 1968 events, Nay's first documentary film was broadcast by France 3 in prime time at the end of May 2018.

For a long time Nay lived with politician and Elf Aquitaine's former leader Albin Chalandon, whom she had met at the political convention of the UNR party. Chalandon married Nay in 2016, after the death of his wife Salomé from whom he had not divorced.

Nay was made an Officier of the National Order of Merit.

Published works

References 

1943 births
Living people
French women journalists
20th-century French journalists
21st-century French journalists
French radio journalists
French women radio journalists
French political commentators
French political journalists
French columnists
French women columnists
French opinion journalists
Officers of the Ordre national du Mérite
Officiers of the Légion d'honneur
Mass media people from Tours, France
20th-century French women writers
21st-century French women writers